In mathematics, a Dirac measure assigns a size to a set based solely on whether it contains a fixed element x or not. It is one way of formalizing the idea of the Dirac delta function, an important tool in physics and other technical fields.

Definition
A Dirac measure is a measure  on a set  (with any -algebra of subsets of ) defined for a given  and any (measurable) set  by

The Dirac measure is a probability measure, and in terms of probability it represents the almost sure outcome  in the sample space .

The name is a back-formation from the Dirac delta function; considered as a Schwartz distribution, for example on the real line, measures can be taken to be a special kind of distribution. The identity

which, in the form

is often taken to be part of the definition of the "delta function", holds as a theorem of Lebesgue integration.

Properties of the Dirac measure
Let  denote the Dirac measure centred on some fixed point  in some measurable space .
  is a probability measure, and hence a finite measure.

  is a strictly positive measure if and only if the topology  is such that  lies within every non-empty open set, e.g. in the case of the trivial topology .
 Since  is probability measure, it is also a locally finite measure.
Hence,  is also a Radon measure.
 The Dirac measure is a sigma-finite measure.

Generalizations
A discrete measure is similar to the Dirac measure, except that it is concentrated at countably many points instead of a single point. More formally, a  measure  on the real line is called a discrete measure (in respect to the Lebesgue measure) if its support is at most a countable set.

See also
 Discrete measure
 Dirac delta function

References

Measures (measure theory)